Punta del Este Street Circuit is a street circuit located in Punta del Este, Uruguay. It runs along the town's harbour – nicknamed the Monte Carlo of South America.

The Argentine TC2000 Championship hosted three races at Punta del Este in 2007, 2008 and 2010.

The Formula E has hosted the Punta del Este ePrix at the venue. The first edition was held on 13 December 2014 during the 2014–15 season. The track had  in length and featured 20 turns.

For season two, the circuit was slightly modified. The first corner was changed, instead of a right-left chicane it is now left-right. The idea behind this change is to make the pit exit much safer than last year, where the cars were exiting the pits on the racing line.

Lap records
The official fastest race lap records at the Punta del Este Street Circuit are listed as:

Gallery

References

Formula E circuits
Punta del Este ePrix
Motorsport venues in Uruguay
Sport in Maldonado Department